Actinium(III) phosphate is a white-colored chemical compound of the radioactive element actinium. This compound was created by reacting actinium(III) chloride with monosodium phosphate. This resulted in the hemihydrate AcPO4·1/2H2O and was confirmed by x-ray diffraction. To become anhydrous, it was heated to 700°C, which resulted in a black solid due to impurities.

References

Actinium compounds
Phosphates